Jake Rodkin is an American video game designer, writer, graphic designer, and podcaster. He was the co-project leader of Tales of Monkey Island and the co-project leader and co-writer of The Walking Dead, Poker Night at the Inventory, and Puzzle Agent 2. He was also the director of the fifth episode of Sam & Max: The Devil's Playhouse, and designer and writer of Firewatch.

Rodkin co-founded the video game developer Campo Santo with Sean Vanaman, Nels Anderson and Olly Moss, and joined Valve when Campo Santo was acquired by the company in 2018. Outside the video game industry, Rodkin also co-founded the Idle Thumbs podcast network and its flagship podcast, which he co-hosted alongside Chris Remo, Nick Breckon and Sean Vanaman.

Career
Jake Rodkin began his career writing for the gaming websites The International House of Mojo and Adventure Gamers, and co-founded Idle Thumbs. He joined Telltale Games as a graphic designer. He eventually became a game designer, director, writer, and project leader at Telltale.  In September 2013, he and Sean Vanaman left Telltale and joined with Olly Moss and Mark of the Ninja lead designer Nels Anderson to found their own studio, Campo Santo. In April 2018, Rodkin joined Valve when the company acquired Campo Santo. Rodkin is also part of Skunkape Games, a studio currently developing remasters of Telltale's Sam & Max games.

Recognition
The re-issue of the comic collection Sam & Max: Surfin' the Highway, which Jake Rodkin co-designed with franchise creator Steve Purcell, was nominated for the Eisner Award for "Best Graphic Album-Reprint" in 2009.

Tales of Monkey Island, for which Jake Rodkin was the season co-director, was nominated for "best artistic design" and won for the award for "biggest surprise" at IGN's Best of E3 2009 Awards. After release, it won the PC Gamer 2009 adventure game of the year, was nominated for the IGN best adventure game of the year for PC and Wii, won the Adventure Gamers Best Adventure of 2009, and was named the "Best Series Revival" by OC Weekly.

Puzzle Agent 2, which was co-written by Jake Rodkin, was nominated for IGN's Best of E3 2011 Awards for "Best iPhone/iPad Game".

The 2012 episodic game series The Walking Dead, in which Jake Rodkin was the season co-designer, won over 80 game of the year awards.

Rodkin won Writing in a Drama at the 2017  National Academy of Video Game Trade Reviewers Awards for his work on Firewatch.

Credited works

Bibliography
2009 Sam & Max: Surfin' the Highway (reprint), graphic design (Telltale Games)

Video games
2006 CSI: 3 Dimensions of Murder, graphic design (Telltale Games)
2006 Bone: The Great Cow Race, graphic design (Telltale Games)
2007 Sam & Max Save the World, graphic design (Telltale Games)
2007 CSI: Hard Evidence, graphic design (Telltale Games)
2008 Sam & Max: Beyond Time and Space, graphic design (Telltale Games)
2008 Strong Bad's Cool Game for Attractive People, graphic design (Telltale Games)
2009 Wallace & Gromit's Grand Adventures, graphic design (Telltale Games)
2009 Tales of Monkey Island, co-project leader (Telltale Games)
2010 Nelson Tethers: Puzzle Agent, writer (Telltale Games)
2010 Sam & Max: The Devil's Playhouse, graphic design, director of The City that Dares Not Sleep (Telltale Games)
2011 Hector: Badge of Carnage, additional art (Telltale Games)
2011 Jurassic Park: The Game, artist (user interface) (Telltale Games)
2011 Puzzle Agent 2, co-writer, co-project leader (Telltale Games)
2012 The Walking Dead, co-project leader (Telltale Games)
2016 Firewatch, director (Campo Santo) 
2020 Half-Life: Alyx, unspecified role (Valve) 
2020 Sam & Max Save the World Remastered, interface design (Skunkape Games)

References

External links
 
 Telltale Games website

American video game designers
Living people
Valve Corporation people
Video game directors
Year of birth missing (living people)
People from Petaluma, California